Diapangou is a department or commune of Gourma Province in north-eastern Burkina Faso. Its capital lies at the town of Diapangou.

Towns and villages
 Balga
 Bandiabgou
 Bardiadeni
 Bassabliga
 Bianargou
 Boaka
 Bossongri
 Comboari
 Diangaïe
 Doaligou
 Fonghin
 Kolonkogo
 Komanpergou
 Kouloungou
 Lantargou
 Litiayenli
 Louargou
 Nahambouga
 Okargouni
 Otiabragouni
 Ountandéni
 Pampangou
 Pendori
 Sikidéni
 Tchomboado
 Tielba
 Tilonti
 Toboani
 Tokouna
 Wakou
 Yensemdéni

References

Departments of Burkina Faso
Gourma Province